Cherie is the 2004 debut album by the French pop and dance music artist Cyndi Almouzni, released under the stage name Cherie. The single "Betcha Never" was featured in the 2003 film Batman: Mystery of the Batwoman.

Track listing
"I'm Ready"
"Say You Love Me (with ROGER TAYLOR)"
"Older Than My Years"
"It's Your Love"
"I Believe In You"
"Betcha Never"
"Body, Soul, & Heart"
"I Belong"
"Fool"
"Rush"
"Promise"
"My Way Back Home"

Singles
 "I'm Ready"
 "Older Than My Years"
 "Betcha Never"

Trivia
Natasha Bedingfield co-wrote the "Betcha Never" song with Dave James and Alan Ross which was featured  the animated film, Batman: Mystery of the Batwoman.
"Betcha Neva" was covered by Thai singer Tata Young on her album "Temperature Rising". It was later covered by Jennifer Rush on her "Now Is The Hour" album.

2004 debut albums
Albums produced by Brian Rawling
Albums produced by Mark Taylor (music producer)
Lava Records albums